"When You're Mad" is a song by American singer-songwriter Ne-Yo. It was written by Ne-Yo and Shea Taylor for Ne-Yo's debut album, In My Own Words (2006), while production was overseen by Taylor. Released as the album's third single in March 2006, the song peaked at number 15 on the US Billboard Hot 100 and reached the top five on the Hot R&B/Hip-Hop Songs chart. Worldwide, "When You're Mad" charted only in Australia, peaking at number 81 in November 2006.

Composition
The song was recorded in the key of F major (written in G major) with a tempo of 87 beats per minute. The song follows a chord progression of Bmaj9C/EF, and Ne-Yo's vocals span from C4 to G5.

Music video
The video features Ne-Yo and his girlfriend on a beach-like area. His girlfriend continuously shown to be angry at him, as different girls who see him are flirting with him. Ne-Yo also invites his girlfriend to a photo shoot, but she ends up getting mad because the photos require him to have women draped over him. At the end, his girlfriend is shown angry again. Ne-Yo gives the camera a wink and makes his way over to her. Throughout the video, during the pre-chorus and chorus, the video shows various women (and one little girl) expressing anger.

Charts

Weekly charts

Year-end charts

Release history

References

2006 singles
2006 songs
Def Jam Recordings singles
Ne-Yo songs
Song recordings produced by Shea Taylor
Songs written by Ne-Yo
Songs written by Shea Taylor